Salt Lake Community College (SLCC) is a public community college in Salt Lake County, Utah.  It is the state's largest two-year college with the most diverse student body. It serves more than 60,000 students on 10 campuses as well as through online classes. The college has a student to faculty ratio of 20:1. Since SLCC is a community college, it focuses on providing associate degrees that students can transfer to any other four-year university in the state to satisfy their first two years of requirements for a bachelor's degree. SLCC has open enrollment and serves the local community, with approximately 95% of the student body considered Utah residents.

Although the college does not offer four-year degrees directly, school officials work with the state's other institutions of higher learning to create partnerships between different schools and ensure that credits are transferable. Salt Lake Community College has partnered with selected four-year institutions to provide opportunities for students to complete a bachelor's degree while remaining on one of SLCC campuses. General education credits may be transferred to any four-year school in Utah including the University of Utah, Utah State University, Utah Valley University as well as private schools such as Brigham Young University and Westminster College.

Campuses

Taylorsville Redwood Campus (1967)
Located at 4600 South Redwood Road in Taylorsville, the Taylorsville Redwood Campus is the primary campus and harbors the school's student center and main offices. Serving over 15,000 students a year, the campus is spread across two city blocks in twelve academic buildings, housing a library (approx 90,000 volumes), athletic facilities, an amphitheater, and a student union.

Anime Banzai and Anime Salt Lake, which are two different anime conventions, were both initially held at the Taylorsville Redwood campus. The Rocky Mountain Revue, a pre-season basketball tournament sponsored by the NBA's Utah Jazz, was hosted in the Lifetime Activities Center until 2008. The arena has hosted professional basketball teams over the years, including the Utah Snowbears, the Salt Lake Dream, the Utah Eagles, and currently the Salt Lake City Stars

South City (1992)

Located at 1575 South State Street in Salt Lake City, the South City Campus occupies the former home of South High School. The campus houses classrooms, labs, and the Grand Theatre, home of the Grand Theatre Foundation and Community Institute. The Grand Theatre facility includes the Historic Fashion Collection, some 1,900 costumes ranging from 1890s to the present.

South City Campus added the Center for Arts and Media (CAM) Building in 2013, thanks to grants from the State of Utah and several community partners including the George S. & Delores Doré Eccles Foundation and Adobe. This addition provides classroom and work space for 17 programs in the School of Arts and Communication, serving approximately 9,000 students.

Jordan Campus (2001)

Located at 3491 West 9000 South in West Jordan, the Jordan Campus is SLCC's third full-service campus. It houses a library, food court, financial aid, a dental clinic for the dental hygienist program, academic advising offices, and Cate Field (where the SLCC baseball team plays its home games).

The nursing program opened at the campus by 2007 in a five-story Health Science building. A UTA TRAX station is planned near the college. Other non-college buildings on the campus include the Jordan School District applied technology center, Itineris Charter School built by Bill Gates, and an LDS Institute of Religion.

Miller Campus (2001)
The Miller Campus, opened in 2001, was donated to SLCC by Larry H. Miller, the late owner of the Utah Jazz and the Salt Lake Bees. It is home to SLCC’s Culinary Institute, and Continuing Education programs such as legal secretary, digital media technology, real estate appraisal and public safety/criminal justice. The Miller Business Resource Center offers four corporate training programs and The Miller Business Innovation Center helps startup companies with operational and educational services. Training facilities for the Utah Department of Public Safety (DPS) on the campus include: Highway Patrol training, DPS development education center, the Utah POST (Peace Officer Standards and Training) academy, and the Department of Corrections training academy.

Meadowbrook Campus
The Meadowbrook Campus is home to general education courses, and several vocational and School of Applied Technology programs including: Diesel Systems Technology; Heating, Ventilation, Air Conditioning (HVAC); Professional Truck Driving; Professional Pilot; and Non-Destructive Testing.

Organization and administration
In September 2014, The Utah Board of Regents named Deneece Huftalin as the SLCC President. She served previously as Vice-President of Student Services. She replaced Cynthia Bioteau.

The Thayne Center is a non-profit organization established in 1994 (originally named the Emma Lou Thayne Community Service Center) to coordinate a variety of service-related programs for SLCC. The college provides the bulk of the Center's budget.

Academics
SLCC offers over 200 degree and certificate programs in academic, technical, and vocational fields. It is accredited by the Northwest Association of Schools and Colleges, and many credits are transferable to the state's four-year colleges. More SLCC graduates attend the University of Utah than graduates of any other institution of higher learning.

Student life

Sports
The SLCC Bruins have competed in the National Junior College Athletic Association (NJCAA) since 1985. Currently, the school fields men's teams in baseball, basketball and soccer, and women's teams in basketball, softball, volleyball and soccer. The Bruins have produced 54 NJCAA All-American athletes since 1985, and has produced 513 Academic All-Region honorees and 192 Academic All-Americans. The men's basketball program advanced to the NJCAA championship game in 2008. The following season, the Bruins returned to the title game, this time defeating Midland College to claim the first national championship in school history.  The Bruins returned to the title game in 2016, winning their second championship by defeating Hutchinson Community College, 74–64.

Prominent professional athletes who trained and competed at SLCC include Justin Braun (soccer), Eddie Gill (basketball), Sinan Güler (basketball), Chris Shelton (baseball), Eddy Alvarez (baseball), and Gary Payton II (basketball).

Mascot
Salt Lake Community College's mascot is a  bruin, "Brutus". He appears at local parades and performs at the women's volleyball and men's basketball games. Brutus has his own Facebook page.

Notable alumni

Notes

Sources
 Randa, Ernest W. Salt Lake Community College: A College on the Move 1949–1998. Agreka Books. 
 Nelson, Jay L. The First Thirty Years: A History of Utah Technical College at Salt Lake. Utah Technical College at Salt Lake. Library of Congress Catalog Card No.: 81-71280

External links

 

  
Buildings and structures in Tooele County, Utah
Community colleges in Utah
Two-year colleges in the United States
Universities and colleges accredited by the Northwest Commission on Colleges and Universities
Universities and colleges in Salt Lake County, Utah
NJCAA athletics
1948 establishments in Utah